Mulzim is a 1963 Hindi film starring Pradeep Kumar, Helen and Shakila.

Cast 
Pradeep Kumar
Shakila
Helen

Soundtrack

References

External links

1963 films
1960s Hindi-language films
Films scored by Ravi